The 2005–06 UEFA Champions League was the 51st season of UEFA's premier European club football tournament, the UEFA Champions League and the 14th since it was rebranded from the European Cup in 1992. 74 teams from 50 football associations took part, starting with the first qualifying round played on 12 July 2005.

The tournament ended with a final between Arsenal and Barcelona at Stade de France, Paris, on 17 May 2006. Barcelona won 2–1 with Juliano Belletti scoring a late winner. Arsenal had taken the lead through a Sol Campbell header in the 37th minute, despite Jens Lehmann being sent off in the 18th minute. Samuel Eto'o brought Barcelona back on level terms in the 76th minute before Belletti scored the winner five minutes later.

The defending champions were Liverpool and as they did not qualify by their league position, UEFA gave them special dispensation and allowed them to defend their title from the first qualifying round of the competition.  They made the group stage and progressed but were eliminated by Benfica in the first knockout round.

Association team allocation
A total of 74 teams from 49 of the 52 UEFA member associations participated in the 2005–06 UEFA Champions League (the exception being Liechtenstein, which does not organise a domestic league, Andorra and San Marino). The association ranking based on the UEFA country coefficients was used to determine the number of participating teams for each association:
Associations 1–3 each have four teams qualify.
Associations 4–6 each have three teams qualify.
Associations 7–15 each have two teams qualify.
Associations 16–50 (except Liechtenstein) each have one team qualify.
As the winners of the 2004–05 UEFA Champions League, Liverpool gained entry an additional entry despite not qualifying through their domestic league position. They were entered into the 1st qualifying round.

Association ranking
For the 2005–06 UEFA Champions League, the associations are allocated places according to their 2004 UEFA country coefficients, which takes into account their performance in European competitions from 1999–2000 to 2003–04.

Apart from the allocation based on the country coefficients, associations may have additional teams participating in the Champions League, as noted below:
 – Additional berth for the 2004–05 UEFA Champions League winners

Distribution
Since the title holder group stage spot was not used as originally intended and was vacated, while extra team (Liverpool) was added to the First qualifying round, the following changes to the default access list were made:
The champions of association 10 (Turkey) are promoted from the third qualifying round to the group stage.
The champions of association 16 (Poland) are promoted from the second qualifying round to the third qualifying round.
The champions of association 26 (Romania) are promoted from the first qualifying round to the second qualifying round.

Teams
League positions of the previous season qualified via league position shown in parentheses. Liverpool qualified as title holders. (TH: Champions League title holders).

Round and draw dates
The schedule of the competition is as follows (all draws are held at UEFA headquarters in Nyon, Switzerland, unless stated otherwise).

Notes

Qualifying rounds

First qualifying round
Title-holders Liverpool, as well as 23 league champions from countries ranked 27 or lower on the 2004 UEFA ranking, were drawn against each other and played two matches, home and away, with the winners advancing to the second qualifying round. Though they finished fifth in the Premier League in 2004–05 (usually only four English teams are allowed in), Liverpool were granted a special exemption by UEFA as the holders, whereby they were placed into the first qualification round.

|}

Second qualifying round
The 12 winners from the first qualifying round, 10 champions from countries ranked 17–26, and six second–placed teams from countries ranked 10–15 were drawn against each other and played two matches, home and away, with the winners advancing to the third qualifying round.

|}

Third qualifying round
The 14 winners from the second qualifying round, six champions from countries ranked 11–16, three second–placed teams from countries ranked 7–9, six third–placed teams from countries ranked 1–6, and three fourth–placed teams from countries ranked 1–3 were drawn to play 2 matches, home and away, with the winners advancing to the group stage and losers advancing to the first round of the UEFA Cup.

|}

Group stage

16 winners from the third qualifying round, 10 champions from countries ranked 1–10, and 6 second-placed teams from countries ranked 1–6 were drawn into 8 groups of 4 teams each. Normally two teams from the same association cannot be drawn in the same group. The only exception is Liverpool because of their abnormal qualification as title holders because not having finished in the top four of the English league, Liverpool were not given "association protection" in the tournament (for group stage, the only team from the same association they could be drawn with was Chelsea, as the rest were in the same seeding pot). The top 2 teams in each group advanced to the Champions League knock-out stage, while the third-placed teams advanced to the Round of 32 in the UEFA Cup.

Tiebreakers are applied in the following order:
Points earned in head-to-head matches between the tied teams.
Total goals scored in head-to-head matches between the tied teams.
Away goals scored in head-to-head matches between the tied teams.
Cumulative goal difference in all group matches.
Total goals scored in all group matches.
Higher UEFA coefficient going into the competition.

Real Betis, Villarreal, Udinese, Thun and Artmedia made their debut appearance in the group stage.

Group A

Group B

Group C

Group D

Group E

Group F

Group G

Group H

Knockout stage

Bracket

Round of 16

|}

Quarter-finals

|}

Semi-finals

|}

Final

Statistics
Statistics exclude qualifying rounds.

Top goalscorers

Source: Top Scorers – Final – Wednesday 17 May 2006 (after match) (accessed 17 May 2006)

Top assists

Source:

See also
2005–06 UEFA Cup
2005–06 UEFA Women's Cup

References

External links

 2005–06 All matches – season at UEFA website
 2005–06 season at UEFA website
 European Club Results at RSSSF
 All scorers 2005–06 UEFA Champions League (excluding qualifying round) according to protocols UEFA + all scorers qualifying round
 2005/06 UEFA Champions League - results and line-ups (archive)
 2005–06 UEFA Champions League List of participants

 
UEFA Champions League seasons
1